God Mode is a co-op, arena-based, third-person shooter video game focusing on survival mode style gameplay. It was developed by Saber Interactive in conjunction with Old School Games and published by Atlus. The game uses Saber Interactive's internal Saber3D Engine. Its gameplay was later used as basis for R.I.P.D. The Game.

Gameplay

Plot
Playing as the descendant of an ancient-God-turned-mere-mortal by Hades, the player and up to three co-op mode friends (online or offline/LAN) must blast their way through the Maze of Hades and its demonic denizens using an arsenal of firearm weaponry and deity inspired magical 'special attacks' in order to avoid eternal damnation.

Reception 

God Mode received a generally mixed reception from critics. Aggregate website Metacritic rated the PC version 58 out of 100 based on 16 reviews, the PlayStation 3 version 60 out of 100 based on 5 reviews, and the Xbox 360 version 58 out of 100 based on 8 reviews.

IGN reviewer Richard Corbett praised the level design and co-op, but criticized the game's technical issues and limited replay value.

References

External links 
  
 Saber Interactive

2013 video games
Atlus games
Cooperative video games
PlayStation 3 games
PlayStation Network games
Saber Interactive games
Third-person shooters
Windows games
Xbox 360 games
Xbox 360 Live Arcade games
Multiplayer and single-player video games
Video games developed in the United States
Video games set in antiquity
Video games based on Greek mythology